Peter J. Campbell (April 13, 1857 – December 20, 1919) was an American lawyer and politician, a member of the Maryland House of Delegates and President of the Maryland Senate.

Born at Baltimore, Maryland, Campbell attended private and public schools, including a private class taught by Woodrow Wilson, and graduated from the law school at the University of Maryland in 1884, and admitted to the bar that year. Politically, he was a  Democrat.  In 1885, he was elected to the Maryland House of Delegates, and twice re-elected. In 1911, he was elected to the Maryland State Senate, where he served as the chairman of the finance committee. Re-elected in 1915, he became the senate president in 1916, a post he held until his death. He was re-elected in 1919, but died before the legislature convened.

References

External links

Democratic Party members of the Maryland House of Delegates
Democratic Party Maryland state senators
1857 births
1919 deaths
Politicians from Baltimore
University of Maryland, College Park alumni
Presidents of the Maryland State Senate
Lawyers from Baltimore
19th-century American politicians
19th-century American lawyers